The Queen of a Distant Country is a 1972 novel by the British writer John Braine. A young writer returns to his northern home town, where he becomes obsessed with an older woman who was herself once a celebrated novelist.

References

Bibliography
 Dale Salwak. John Braine and John Wain: A Reference Guide. G. K. Hall, 1980.

1972 British novels
Novels by John Braine
Methuen Publishing books